The SNCASE SE-400 was a prototype French twin-engined coastal patrol floatplane of the Second World War. A single example was flown, but development was abandoned in May 1940 owing to the German invasion of France.

Design and development

In 1937 the French Air Ministry issued specification A46 for a three-seat coastal reconnaissance seaplane to replace the obsolete CAMS 37 biplane flying boats of the French Navy. To meet this requirement, the Société Nationale des Constructions Aéronautiques du Sud-Est (SNCASE) designed a twin-engined monoplane floatplane, the SE-400, work beginning on construction of two prototypes in March 1938.

The SE.400 was of mixed construction, with a steel tube fuselage and wooden wings. It had a twin tail and was powered by two 655 hp (489 kW) Gnome-Rhône 14M radial engines. The aircraft's undercarriage consisted of two light alloy floats mounted beneath the engines.

Operational history
The first prototype, the SE.400-01 made its maiden flight from Marignane on 31 December 1939. Flight testing showed that the SE-400 suffered from stability problems, and the aircraft had a new, larger, tail assembly fitted and its nose lengthened. These modifications resolved the aircraft's handling problems, but by this time the competing Breguet Nautilus had been ordered into production.

The war situation and the continuing delays in the program resulted in the development of the SE-400 being abandoned on 24 May 1940, with the second prototype, a landplane powered by two 500 hp (373 kW) Lorraine 9N Algol engines, left incomplete.

Operators

French Navy

Specifications

See also

Notes

References

 Green, William. War Planes of the Second World War:Volume Five Flying Boats. London: Macdonald, 1968. .
 Green, William. War Planes of the Second World War:Volume Six Floatplanes. London: Macdonald, 1962.
 Hartmann, Gérard. "Les réalisations de la SNCASE". hydroretro.net. 5 January 2005. Retrieved 6 January 2011.

External links
Aviafrance

1930s French military reconnaissance aircraft
SE-0400
Floatplanes
Low-wing aircraft
Aircraft first flown in 1939
Twin piston-engined tractor aircraft